Marleen Verheuen (born 31 December 1954) is a Belgian middle-distance runner. She competed in the women's 800 metres at the 1972 Summer Olympics.

References

1954 births
Living people
Athletes (track and field) at the 1972 Summer Olympics
Belgian female middle-distance runners
Olympic athletes of Belgium
Place of birth missing (living people)